Abdal Al Al Hamamsi (Arabic: عبد العال الحمامصي) was an Egyptian writer and novelist, born in Akhmim, Sohag Governorate, on June 1, 1932. He was one of the founders of the Egyptian Writers Union, and he died on August 7, 2009, at the age of 77, after a long struggle with cancer.

Career 
Abdal Al Al Hamamsi, upon his arrival in Cairo from Akhmim, Sohag Governorate in Upper Egypt, worked in the field of film production with producer Adly El-Mould. Then, he entered the world of journalism and literature, writing for a number of Egyptian newspapers and magazines, and worked as a writer and supervisor for the cultural section of Al-Sabah magazine, Al-Alam Al-Arabi magazine, Al-Hilal magazine, Al-Zohour magazine, and Al-Qasas magazine. Then he held the position of editor-in-chief of the "Literary Brightenings" series, which is issued by the Egyptian General Book Organization.

He participated in the establishment of the Egyptian Writers Union in 1976 with the late writers Youssef El-Sebaei and Tharwat Abaza, and remained a founding member of the Union’s board of directors, then rose in positions until he reached the position of Secretary-General of the Union in 2003, as he was a member of the Board of Directors of the Egyptian Story Club and Secretary He is a member of the Egyptian Writers Association Board of Directors, a member of the Story and First Book committees of the Supreme Council of Culture, and a member of the National Council for Culture, Arts and Letters.

Work 
Abdal Al Al Hamamsi has written many books that range from novels, stories, critical studies, intellectual works, and dialogue, including:

 Chicks have wings (Original title: Lil Katakeet Ajneha),1967, Dar Al-Kateb Al-Arabi for Printing and Publishing in Cairo
 Conversations about literature, art and culture, 1988, Dar Al Maaref for Publishing and Distribution in Cairo
 Pens in the procession of enlightenment, 1996, the Egyptian General Book Authority in Cairo within the family library project
 Al Ahbash’s Well (Original title: Be’r Al Ahbash)
 Ideas for My Ummah, 1999, the Egyptian General Book Authority in Cairo within the family library project
 This Voice and Others, 2001, the Egyptian General Book Authority in Cairo
 Al-Busairi..the greatest praiser of the Prophet, 1993, Al-Rayyan Foundation for Printing, Publishing and Distribution in Cairo
 The Qur'an is a miracle for all ages
 They are leaving in my heart
 This is how Naguib Mahfouz spoke (interviews), 2006, the General Authority for Cultural Palaces in Cairo
 John the American preaches in the pub (collection of short stories), 2006, Neferu House for Publishing and Distribution in Cairo.

Prizes 
Abdal Al Al Hamamsi has been honored by many Egyptian and Arab authorities, and has received many literary awards, the most important are:

 The State Incentive Award in Literature from the Supreme Council of Culture in 1981.
 Medal of Science and Arts, first class, in 1982 and 1993.
 The State Prize for Excellence in Arts in 2003.

Death 
Abdal Al Al Hamamsi died on Friday the seventh of August 2009, corresponding to the sixteenth of Sha’ban 1430, at the age of 77, after a long struggle with cancer.

References 

Egyptian male writers
Egyptian novelists
Arab writers
1932 births
2009 deaths